Homer Craig is an American former Negro league pitcher who played in the 1930s.

Craig played for the Newark Dodgers in 1934 and 1935. In 16 recorded games, he posted six hits in 26 plate appearances with a 5.91 ERA in 77.2 innings on the mound.

References

External links
 and Seamheads

Year of birth missing
Place of birth missing
Newark Dodgers players
Baseball pitchers